Elvis Defreitas (born 20 January 1981) is an international football player from Barbados. Defreitas currently plays for English Southern Counties East League side Croydon

He previously spent two spells at Guildford City F.C. between 2009 and 2013 and in 2014. Defreitas also played briefly for Chipstead FC in 2013.

References

External links

Elvis Defreitas at the Caribbean Football Database

1981 births
Living people
Barbadian footballers
Barbados international footballers
Barbadian expatriate footballers
Barbadian expatriate sportspeople in England
Expatriate footballers in England
Guildford City F.C. players
Chipstead F.C. players
Association football fullbacks